Springer Vieweg Verlag (formerly known as Vieweg+Teubner Verlag) is a German publishing company that specializes in books on technical subjects. It is a subsidiary of Springer Science+Business Media. 

The original  was founded in Berlin in 1786 by Friedrich Vieweg. The firm's headquarters were in Braunschweig from 1799 to 1974, at which time they were moved to Wiesbaden. In 2012, the joint firm was acquired by Springer Science+Business Media and is now known as Springer Vieweg Verlag.

The  publisher focuses on construction engineering, electrical engineering, information technology, mathematics, mechanical engineering and natural sciences. According to the publisher, more than 30 Nobel Prize laureates have been published by Vieweg Verlag, among which are Albert Einstein and Max Planck.

References

External links
 Official website

Publishing companies of Germany
Companies based in Wiesbaden
Mass media in Wiesbaden